Caldera De Coatepeque (Nahuat cōātepēc, "at the snake hill") is a volcanic caldera in El Salvador in Central America. The caldera was formed during a series of  rhyolitic explosive eruptions between about 72,000 and 57,000 years ago. Since then, basaltic cinder cones and lava flows formed near the west edge of the caldera, and six rhyodacitic lava domes have formed. The youngest dome, Cerro Pacho, formed after 8000 BC.

Lake Coatepeque

Lake Coatepeque (Lago de Coatepeque) is a large crater lake in the east part of the Coatepeque Caldera. It is in Coatepeque municipality, Santa Ana, El Salvador. There are hot springs near the lake margins. At , it is one of the largest lakes in El Salvador. In the lake is the island of Teopan, which was a Mayan site of some importance.

See also
List of volcanoes in El Salvador

References

External links

Lakes of El Salvador
Volcanoes of El Salvador
Calderas of Central America
Volcanic crater lakes
Biosphere reserves of El Salvador